Biggar is a town in central Saskatchewan, Canada.

Biggar has become well known for its unusual town slogan, an Olympic athlete, and a world-record deer.  The town was featured on American morning newsmagazine The Today Show in February 2010 as part of an ongoing Canadian-oriented segment during the 2010 Winter Olympics.

History
Biggar was incorporated as a village in 1909. It was named after William Hodgins Biggar, general counsel of the Grand Trunk Pacific (GTP) railway which had come through the area in 1908. Prior to that, the major means of transportation was via the nearby Swift Current-Battleford Trail. The Grand Trunk Pacific Railway (GTP) made Biggar a divisional point on its line, building a large station and roundhouse.  The population grew as Biggar became a home terminal where train crews were changed.

In 1911 Biggar was incorporated as a town.  Settlement continued and the population increased to greater than 2,000 by the mid-1920s, peaking at 2,755 in 1966. According to the 2011 census, Biggar is now home to 2,161 people.

The town is known for its slogan "New York is big, but this is Biggar."  It was created in 1914 by a survey crew who painted it onto a town sign as a drunken prank.  According to The Biggar Museum and Gallery, the graffiti remained unchanged until 1954 when the slogan was officially adopted.

Demographics 

Economy
The Biggar railway station was constructed in 1909–1910 and is serviced by Via Rail, with The Canadian serving the station twice a week.  Biggar's prosperity was directly tied to the railway for many years.  Up to 500 local people were at one time employed by Canadian National Railway (CN), which took over the Grand Trunk Pacific Railway (GTP).  That number has now dropped to under 200.  As the railway industry has decreased, Biggar has shifted its economy to agriculture and related industries.

Biggar is home to Prairie Malt Limited, a large barley processing plant.  The malthouse has an annual capacity of 220,000 metric tonnes.  Malt is a primary ingredient in beer and whisky.  Prairie Malt employs approximately 70 full-time employees.  It creates significant spin-off employment among local trucking firms such as Biggar Transport, with a fleet of over 50 trucks.

The Town of Biggar lists more than 150 businesses and services on its website. These include a manufacturer of petroleum and hazardous material containment tanks, a sodium sulphate plant, a large greenhouse and a variety of financial, farm and health services.

Education
Two school divisions operate in Biggar.

Current schools 
The public school is Biggar Central 2000, a kindergarten to grade twelve school a part of Sun West School Division.  Greater Saskatoon Catholic Schools operates St. Gabriel School, a Catholic kindergarten to grade nine school.

Great Plains College offers post-secondary certificates and diplomas in nursing, emergency medical technician, electrician and truck driving.

Former schools
 Biggar's original classroom was on the second floor of the Biggar Hotel (2 Jan 1910 – May 1910) while Biggar Public School was being built.
 Biggar Public School was built in 1910, and was demolished in 1962.
 Thornton School was built in 1924, demolished in 1972.

Parks and recreation 
Biggar has several recreational facilities and parks in and around town. There's an ice rink, curling rink, ball diamonds, and aquatic centre. About one kilometre north of town is Biggar & District Regional Park, which has a campground and golf course.

Notable People

 Boushie, Colton – Biggar was the nearest urban community to the death of Colten Boushie on 6 August 2016, when the man of the Red Pheasant Cree Nation was fatally shot on a farm.
 Coldwell, James (Major) Biggar elected Major James Coldwell, the leader of the Co-operative Commonwealth Federation, as their Member of Parliament from 1935 to 1958. He was noted as the person that fought for and won old-age pensions, as well as other social democratic reforms in both the William Lyon Mackenzie-King and Louis St. Laurent governments.
 Cutler, David  – Longtime Edmonton Eskimos kicker Dave Cutler was born in Biggar.
 Hanson, Milo  – The town is home to the world-famous "Hanson Buck." Milo Hanson is a Biggar-area farmer and hunter who in 1993 shot a white-tailed deer that was awarded the Boone and Crockett Club world's record. Hanson reported that after the award was made public, he received hundreds of calls from journalists, photographers and artists wanting to tell the story. His record remains unbeaten.
 Schmirler, Sandra – Biggar is the hometown of Sandra Schmirler, a 1998 Olympic gold medalist and three-time world champion in women's curling. Schmirler died in 2000 at the age of 36 of cancer. Her funeral was broadcast nationally by CBC Television and TSN, a first for a Canadian athlete. Biggar honoured Schmirler's contributions to sport and her hometown by constructing the Sandra Schmirler Olympic Gold Park, which houses a gazebo, playground, memorial and wall of fame.
 Weekes, Randall (Randy) Percival – Canadian politician.  Member of the Saskatchewan Legislative Assembly (1999  – ) Born in Biggar (1956).

Government
Biggar's current mayor is Jim Rickwood.  The Town of Biggar is located within the Rural Municipality of Biggar #347.  Provincially, Biggar is represented by MLA Randy Weekes of the Saskatchewan Party. Federally the town is within the riding of Carlton Trail-Eagle Creek, whose current MP is Kelly Block of the Conservative Party of Canada.

Climate

Biggar experiences a humid continental (Köppen climate classification Dfb).

See also 
 List of communities in Saskatchewan
 List of towns in Saskatchewan

References

External links

 
Biggar No. 347, Saskatchewan
Towns in Saskatchewan